Cirsium thistle species are used as food plants by the larvae of some Lepidoptera species, including:

 Coleophoridae
 Several Coleophora case-bearer species:
 C. paripennella
 C. peribenanderi – recorded on creeping thistle (C. arvense) and probably others
 Geometridae
 Ectropis crepuscularia (engrailed) – recorded on creeping thistle (C. arvense)
 Eupithecia absinthiata (wormwood pug) – recorded on creeping thistle (C. arvense)
 Eupithecia centaureata (lime-speck pug)
 Eupithecia subfuscata (grey pug) – recorded on creeping thistle (C. arvense)
 Odontopera bidentata (scalloped hazel) – recorded on creeping thistle (C. arvense)
 Noctuidae
 Melanchra persicariae (dot moth) – recorded on creeping thistle (C. arvense)
 Noctua comes (lesser yellow underwing)
 Xestia c-nigrum (setaceous Hebrew character) – recorded on creeping thistle (C. arvense)
 Polygonia c-album (comma)
 Pyralidae
 Myelois circumvoluta (thistle ermine)
 Sphingidae
Macroglossum stellatarum (hummingbird hawk-moth)

References

External links 

Cirsium
+Lepidoptera